Christmas Queens 4 is a holiday album featuring covers of Christmas songs by contestants of RuPaul's Drag Race. The album was released on November 16, 2018. It is the fourth installment of the Christmas Queens album series.

Composition
The album opens with Jinkx Monsoon performing "Jingle Bell Rock", followed by Blair St. Clair and BeBe Zahara Benet with "Last Christmas" and "Little Drummer Boy", respectively. Manila Luzon's "It's the Most Wonderful Time of the Year" is followed by Alaska Thunderfuck on "Santa Baby". The next tracks feature Eureka O'Hara, Kameron Michaels, and Asia O'Hara on "Grandma Got Run Over by a Reindeer", "Let It Snow", and "'Cause I'm Rich", respectively. Following are Jujubee on "Santa Claus Is Coming to Town" and Sharon Needles on "Brothers in Our World". The album closes with Ginger Minj's "Have Yourself a Merry Little Christmas".

Promotion

In November and December 2018, five of the album's artists—Sharon Needles, Manila Luzon, Kameron Michaels, Eureka O'Hara and Asia O'Hara—embarked on a Christmas Queens tour in Europe, together with Bob the Drag Queen and Jiggly Caliente, where they performed some of the album's songs.

Track listing

References

External links
 

2018 Christmas albums
2018 compilation albums
Christmas compilation albums
Pop Christmas albums
RuPaul's Drag Race albums
Producer Entertainment Group albums